The 1969 Player's County League was the first competing of what was colloquially known as the Sunday League.  The second one-day league in England and Wales, it consisted of the seventeen first-class counties playing each other on Sunday afternoons throughout the season.  The competition was won by Lancashire County Cricket Club.

Standings

Batting averages

Bowling averages

See also
Sunday League

References

John Play
Pro40